Ontario–East station is a Metrolink train station in Ontario, California, United States. Metrolink's Riverside Line trains between Los Angeles Union Station and Riverside–Downtown station stop here.

The station is owned and operated by the City of Ontario. Omnitrans Route 81 also operates to the station. Ontario–East is the closest station to Ontario International Airport. Airport passengers can take Omnitrans Route 81 to the consolidated rental car facility on Haven Avenue, where an airport shuttle will deliver them to the terminal. There are 656 parking spaces available at the station.

See also 
 Ontario station (Amtrak)

References

External links 

Metrolink stations in San Bernardino County, California
Amtrak Thruway Motorcoach stations in California
Railway stations in the United States opened in 1993